Linear management is the application of reductionism to management problems, often relying on the ability to predict, engineer and control outcomes by manipulating the component parts of a business (organization, operation, policy, process and so on). Business process reengineering (BPR) is a popular example of linear management at work. The key defining characteristic of linear management is that order is imposed – usually from above.

Nonlinear management (NLM) is a superset of management techniques and strategies that allows order to emerge by giving organizations the space to self-organize, evolve and adapt, encompassing Agile, "evolutionary" and "lean" approaches, flextime, time banking, as well as many others. Key aspects of NLM, including holism, evolutionary design or delivery, and self-organization are diametrically opposite to linear management thinking.

Examples of nonlinear management at work
Agile software development

References
H. Richard Priesmeyer. ORGANIZATIONS AND CHAOS: Defining the Methods of Nonlinear Management. Quorum Books. 1992.
Margaret J. Wheatley. Leadership & The New Science: Discovering Order In A Chaotic World. Berrett-Koehler. 2001.

External links
What Disaster Response Management Can Learn From Chaos Theory – H. Richard Priesmeyer & Edward G. Cole

Management by type